Crestano Menarola (1605 - 1687)  was an Italian print-maker and painter of the Baroque period. He trained in Vicenza under Alessandro Maganza, then moved to work in Bassano del Grappa. He followed the style of Paolo Veronese. He also painted for churches and palaces, but little of his painted work remains. He painted for the presbytery in Asiago. He painted portrait of Federico da Molin for the Audience Hall in the Palazzo Pretorio of Bassano. He painted altarpieces for the Cathedral and the chapel of Spirito Santo in the church of San Francisco in Bassano. His son, Marco, was also a painter. Pietro Menarola, an engraver, was also a member of his family. A Sacrifice of Iphigenia, attributed to Menarola is in display in the Pinacoteca of Palazzo Chiericati, Vicenza. Among his prints, is a Descent of the Holy Spirit, after a design of Jacopo Bassano.

References

1605 births
1687 deaths
17th-century Italian painters
Italian male painters
Italian Baroque painters
Painters from Vicenza